Voyageurs are professional canoemen who transported furs by canoe during the fur-trade era in North America.

Voyageur may also refer to:

People
 Coureurs des bois, independent fur traders in 17th and 18th century North America - sometimes called voyageurs

Transportation
 Terminus Voyageur (disambiguation)
 Casa-Voyageurs railway station, Casablanca, Morocco
 Voyageur Colonial Bus Lines, a Canadian intercity bus company
 Voyageur Airways, a Canadian charter airline
 DTA Voyageur, a French ultralight trike design

Literature
 Voyageurs (novel), a 2003 novel by Margaret Elphinstone
 Le Voyageur, weekly newspaper for Sudbury, Ontario, Canada
 Voyageur Press, an imprint of UK publishing house The Quarto Group

Music
 Voyageur (Enigma album), 2003
 "Voyageur" (song), on the Enigma album
 Voyageur (Kathleen Edwards album), 2012

Education and Schools 
 Voyageurs (camp), a French-language immersion program run through the Concordia Language Villages
École des Voyageurs, a French-language elementary school in Langley, British Columbia, Canada
Voyageur Elementary School, an English-language elementary school in Quesnel, British Columbia, Canada
Society of Les Voyageurs, student fraternity at the University of Michigan

Other uses
 Voyageurs National Park, a US National Park in Minnesota, USA
 Ilot Voyageur, a city block and central bus terminal in Montreal, Quebec, Canada
 Festival du Voyageur, winter festival in Winnipeg, Manitoba, Canada
 Voyageurs Cup, Canadian pro-soccer club championship trophy
 The Voyageurs, a Canadian soccer fan club founded in 1996

See also

 
 
Voyager (disambiguation)
Voyage (disambiguation)